Seyyed Taher Fazeli (also Romanized as Seyyed Ţāher Fāz̤elī; also known as Seyyed Ţāher) is a village in Elhayi Rural District, in the Central District of Ahvaz County, Khuzestan Province, Iran. At the 2006 census, its population was 147, in 24 families.

References 

Populated places in Ahvaz County